Edwardsville is a borough in Luzerne County, Pennsylvania, United States. The population was 4,918 at the 2020 census.

History
Edwardsville was first settled in 1768 by settlers from Connecticut. It was later incorporated as a borough in 1884.

Geography
 
Edwardsville is located at  (41.266081, -75.908457).

The Susquehanna River makes up the borough's southern border.

Transportation
U.S. Route 11 is the only major highway running through Edwardsville.

Demographics

As of the census of 2000, there were 4,984 people, 2,345 households, and 1,280 families living in the borough. The population density was 4,233.5 people per square mile (1,630.8/km2). There were 2,587 housing units at an average density of 2,197.4 per square mile (846.5/km2).

The racial makeup of the borough was 95.43% White, 2.57% African American, 0.30% Native American, 0.30% Asian, 0.36% from other races, and 1.04% from two or more races. Hispanic or Latino of any race were 1.18% of the population.

There were 2,345 households, out of which 26.6% had children under the age of 18 living with them, 31.2% were married couples living together, 18.9% had a female householder with no husband present, and 45.4% were non-families. 41.1% of all households were made up of individuals, and 21.3% had someone living alone who was 65 years of age or older. The average household size was 2.09 and the average family size was 2.81.

In the borough the population was spread out, with 22.7% under the age of 18, 8.8% from 18 to 24, 26.7% from 25 to 44, 20.6% from 45 to 64, and 21.2% who were 65 years of age or older. The median age was 38 years. For every 100 females there were 78.8 males. For every 100 females age 18 and over, there were 73.0 males.

The median income for a household in the borough was $20,000, and the median income for a family was $26,908. Males had a median income of $25,733 versus $21,657 for females. The per capita income for the borough was $13,464. About 26.9% of families and 25.9% of the population were below the poverty line, including 34.6% of those under age 18 and 28.1% of those age 65 or over.

References

External links

Populated places established in 1768
Boroughs in Luzerne County, Pennsylvania
1768 establishments in Pennsylvania
1884 establishments in Pennsylvania